Taron Egerton is a Welsh actor who has received various awards and nominations throughout his career.

Egerton first gained recognition for starring as Gary "Eggsy" Unwin in the action comedy film Kingsman: The Secret Service (2014) and its sequel Kingsman: The Golden Circle (2017), for which he won the Empire Award for Best Male Newcomer and was nominated for the Saturn Award for Best Actor. In 2014, he was also one of the nominees for the BAFTA Rising Star Award. He received critical acclaim for his portrayal of singer-songwriter Elton John in the musical Rocketman (2019). The role won him the Golden Globe Award for Best Actor in a Motion Picture – Musical or Comedy and earned him nominations for the BAFTA Award for Best Actor in a Leading Role, the Screen Actors Guild Award for Outstanding Performance by a Male Actor in a Leading Role, and the Grammy Award for Best Compilation Soundtrack for Visual Media for his work on the film score. He starred in the Apple TV+ miniseries Black Bird (2022), which garnered him further nominations at the Golden Globe Awards and Screen Actors Guild Awards.

Major associations

British Academy Film Awards

Golden Globe Awards

Grammy Awards

Screen Actors Guild Awards

Other associations

Audie Awards

CinemaCon Awards

Dorian Awards

Empire Awards

Golden Schmoes Awards

GQ Awards

Hollywood Film Awards

Hollywood Music in Media Awards

Huading Awards

London Film Festival Awards

National Film Awards UK

NME Awards

People's Choice Awards

Santa Barbara International Film Festival Awards

Satellite Awards

Saturn Awards

Teen Choice Awards

Critics associations

Notes

References

External links
 

Egerton, Taron